Le Roux Hamman (born 6 January 1992) is a South African athlete competing in the 400 metres hurdles. He represented his country at the 2016 Summer Olympics without advancing from the first round.

His personal best in the event is 49.24 seconds set in Pretoria in 2016.

International competitions

References

1992 births
Living people
South African male hurdlers
Athletes (track and field) at the 2016 Summer Olympics
Olympic athletes of South Africa
University of Pretoria alumni
Competitors at the 2017 Summer Universiade